Edgar Holt may refer to:
 Edgar Holt (American football), American football coach
 Edgar George Holt, Australian journalist